"The Last Thing on My Mind" is a song written by Al Anderson and Craig Wiseman, and recorded by American country music artist Patty Loveless. The song was released in December 2000 as the second single from her album Strong Heart.  Rebecca Lynn Howard and Ricky Skaggs join her in background harmony on the song.

Chart positions
The song charted for 22 weeks on the Billboard Hot Country Singles and Tracks chart, reaching number twenty during the week of April 14, 2001.

References

2000 singles
2000 songs
Patty Loveless songs
Songs written by Al Anderson (NRBQ)
Songs written by Craig Wiseman
Music videos directed by Trey Fanjoy
Song recordings produced by Emory Gordy Jr.
Epic Records singles